This list of University of Texas at Austin alumni includes notable graduates, non-graduate former students, and current students of the University of Texas at Austin. The institution is a major research university in Downtown Austin, Texas, US and is the flagship institution of the University of Texas System. Founded in 1883, the university has had the fifth largest single-campus enrollment in the nation as of Fall 2006 (and had the largest enrollment in the country from 1997 to 2003), with over 50,000 undergraduate and graduate students and 16,500 faculty and staff. It currently holds the second largest enrollment of all colleges in the state of Texas.

Over 30 UT Austin undergraduates have served in the U.S. Senate and U.S. House of Representatives, such as Lloyd Bentsen '42, who served as both a U.S. senator and U.S. representative, and was the 1988 Democratic Party vice presidential nominee. Tom C. Clark, J.D. '22, served as United States attorney general from 1945 to 1949 and as an associate justice of the Supreme Court of the United States from 1949 to 1967.  Cabinet members of American presidents include former United States secretary of state Rex Tillerson '75, former United States secretary of state James Baker '57, former secretary of education William J. Bennett, and former secretary of commerce Donald Evans '73. First Lady Laura Bush '73 and daughter Jenna '04 both graduated from UT Austin, as well as former first lady Lady Bird Johnson '33 & '34 and her eldest daughter Lynda. In foreign governments, the university has been represented by Fernando Belaúnde Terry '36 (42nd president of Peru), and Abdullah al-Tariki (co-founder of OPEC).

UT Austin alumni in academia include the 26th president of the College of William & Mary Gene Nichol '76, the 10th president of Boston University Robert A. Brown '73 & '75, and the 8th president of the University of Southern California John R. Hubbard. The university also graduated Alan Bean '55, the fourth man to walk on the Moon. Additionally, alumni of the university who have served as business leaders include ExxonMobil Corporation former CEO Rex Tillerson '75, Dell founder and CEO Michael Dell, founder & CEO of Keyhole and pioneer of the successor Google Maps & Google Earth John Hanke, and CEO of Southwest Airlines Gary C. Kelly.

In literature and journalism, UT Austin has produced Pulitzer Prize winners Gail Caldwell and Ben Sargent '70, as well as CNN anchor Betty Nguyen '95. Alumnus J. M. Coetzee also received the 2003 Nobel Prize in Literature.

UT Austin has produced several musicians and entertainers. Janis Joplin, the singer who posthumously was inducted into the Rock and Roll Hall of Fame and received a Grammy Lifetime Achievement Award attended the university, as well as February 1955 Playboy Playmate of the Month and Golden Globe recipient Jayne Mansfield. The big screen has carried the talents of actor Matthew McConaughey '93 (star of The Wedding Planner (2001), How to Lose a Guy in 10 Days (2003), Sahara (2005), We Are Marshall (2007), et al.) with Farrah Fawcett (one of the original Charlie's Angels) on the small screen.

A number of UT Austin alumni have found success in professional sports. Seven-time Cy Young Award-winner Roger Clemens entered the MLB after helping the Longhorns win the 1983 College World Series. Professional basketball player and Olympic gold medalist Kevin Durant played one season with the Longhorns. Several Olympic medalists have also attended the school, including 2008 Summer Olympics athletes Ian Crocker '05 (swimming world record holder and two-time Olympic gold medalist) and 4 × 400 m relay defending Olympic gold medalist Sanya Richards '06. Mary Lou Retton (the first female gymnast outside Eastern Europe to win the Olympic all-around title, five-time Olympic medalist, and 1984 Sports Illustrated Sportswoman of the Year) also attended the university.

Academia and research

University deans, chancellors, and presidents

Professors, doctors and researchers 
{| class="wikitable sortable" style="width:100%"
|-
! style="width:15%;"| Name
! style="width:5%;"| Class year(s)
! style="width:10%;"| Degree(s)
! style="width:*;" class="unsortable"| Notability
! style="width:5%;" class="unsortable"| Reference
|-
| 
| style="text-align:center;"| 1989
| PhD
| Psychologist specialized in sexual orientation
| style="text-align:center;"|
|-
| 
| style="text-align:center;"| 2008
| PhD
| American professional astronomer and science communicator
| style="text-align:center;"|
|-
| 
| style="text-align:center;"| 1955
| BSc
| Astronaut, lunar module pilot on Apollo 12
| style="text-align:center;"|
|-
| 
| style="text-align:center;" | 1935
| BA
| Mathematician
| style="text-align:center;" |
|-
| 
| style="text-align:center;" | 1961
| PhD
| Psychologist specializing in self and social perception; creator of the Birkman Method assessment
| style="text-align:center;" |
|-
| 
| style="text-align:center;" | 19351938
| BAMA
| Law professor at Columbia and Yale; pioneer in civil rights litigation; author of leading treatise on the law of admiralty
| style="text-align:center;" |
|-
| 
| style="text-align:center;" | 19741977
| MAPhD
| Order of the Aztec Eagle medal recipient for work in Mesoamerican art history
| style="text-align:center;" |
|-
| 
| style="text-align:center;" | 1967
| BA
| Computer scientist, co-inventor of the Boyer–Moore string-search algorithm
| style="text-align:center;" |
|-
| 
| style="text-align:center;" | 1966
| BA
| Professor of Linguistics at the University of Washington
| style="text-align:center;" |
|-
|
| style="text-align:center;" | 19891994
| MBAPhD
| Former finance professor, Santa Clara University; President and Executive Director, Ayn Rand Institute
| style="text-align:center;" | 
|-
|
| style="text-align:center;" | 1958
| PhD
| Geneticist, University of Texas Medical Branch in Galveston and University of Texas Health Science Center. President of the American Society of Human Genetics.
| style="text-align:center;" |
|-
|
| style="text-align:center;" |
| B.SW.
|Research professor University of Houston Graduate College of Social Work
| style="text-align:center;" | 
|-
| 
| style="text-align:center;" | 1978
| PhD
| Physicist, leader in nonlinear dynamics, PhD student of Ilya Prigogine
| style="text-align:center;" |
|-
| 
| style="text-align:center;" | 19681973
| BScMA
| Science educator and entomologist
| style="text-align:center;" |
|-
| 
| style="text-align:center;" | 19501961
| BAPhD
| Inventor of sports drink Gatorade
| style="text-align:center;" |
|-
| 
| style="text-align:center;" | 196819721976
| BAMAPhD
| Animal behaviorist, President of the University of Lethbridge
| style="text-align:center;" |
|-
| 
| style="text-align:center;" | 196519671970
| BScMScPhD
| Author of the textbook Digital Image Processing, president of Advanced Digital Imaging Research
| style="text-align:center;" |
|-
|Almadena Chtchelkanova
| style="text-align:center;"|1996
|MA
|Developed and implemented portable, scalable, parallel adaptive mesh generation algorithms for computational fluid dynamics, weather forecast, combustion and contaminant transport
| style="text-align:center;"|
|-
|Christina Cogdell
| style="text-align:center;"|19912001
|BAPhD
|Professor of Design, University of California, Davis
| style="text-align:center;"|
|-
| 
| style="text-align:center;"| 1960
| BSc
| Pilot of STS-1, first orbital test flight of NASA Shuttle program
| style="text-align:center;"|
|-
|Mohammed Dajani Daoudi
|
|MSc
|Palestinian professor and peace activist
| style="text-align:center;"|
|-
| 
| style="text-align:center;"| 18931894
| BScMSc
| Prolific American Mathematician
| style="text-align:center;"| 
|-
|  
| style="text-align:center;"| 1976
| BSc
| Computer scientist, A. M. Turing Award
| style="text-align:center;"|
|-
| 
| style="text-align:center;"|
| BAMAPhD
| Historian of the United States, the American West, and Texas
| style="text-align:center;"|
|-
| 
| style="text-align:center;"| 1963
| BA
| Heart surgeon
| style="text-align:center;"|
|-
|Jinlong Gong
| style="text-align:center;"|2008
|PhD
|Chinese chemist
|
|-
| 
| style="text-align:center;"|19311945
| MAPhD
| Influential fisheries scientist who pioneered the study of fisheries in the northern Gulf of Mexico
| style="text-align:center;"|
|-
|Laura M. Haas
|1981
|PhD
|Computer scientist; created systems for data and mapping technology
|
|-
| 
| style="text-align:center;"| 19761980
| MAPhD
| Chair and professor of Art History at the University of Illinois at Chicago; historian and photographer specializing in contemporary art, American spaces and landscapes
| style="text-align:center;"|
|-
| 
| style="text-align:center;"| 1977
| MA
| Ethnolinguist
| style="text-align:center;"|
|-
| 
| style="text-align:center;"| early1940s
| MS
| Chemist, physicist; major contributor to the miniaturization of computers 
| style="text-align:center;"|
|-
| 
| style="text-align:center;"| 
| Medical Degree
| Family physician and surgeon
| style="text-align:center;"|
|-
| 
| style="text-align:center;"| 1984
| PhD
| Professor of chemistry at St. Edward's University
| style="text-align:center;"|
|-
| 
| style="text-align:center;"|
| MA and PhD
| Professor at Southern Methodist University 
| style="text-align:center;"|
|-
| 
| style="text-align:center;"| 19231928
| BAMAPhD
| Historian, archaeologist, first director of the Museum of Texas Tech University in Lubbock
| style="text-align:center;"|
|-
|Nancy B. Jackson
|style="text-align:center;"|1990
|PhD
|Chemist, former president of the American Chemical Society
|style="text-align:center;"|
|-
|
| style="text-align:center;"|1953
|PhD
|Chinese biochemist, the first citizen of the People's Republic of China to be nominated for the Nobel Prize in 1979
| style="text-align:center;"|
|-
| 
| style="text-align:center;"| 1935
| PhD
| Mathematician
| style="text-align:center;"|
|-
| 
| style="text-align:center;"| 1992
| PhD
| Professor of neuroscience at University of Texas at Austin
| style="text-align:center;"| 
|-
|
| style="text-align:center;"|1998
| PhD
| Professor of comparative literature, director of the Center for Iranian Diaspora Studies at San Francisco State University
|style="text-align:center;"|
|-
| 
| style="text-align:center;"| 19291930
| BAMA
| Political scientist; studied elections and voting behavior; taught at UCLA; professor at Johns Hopkins University; Alfred Cowles Professor of Government at Yale University; Jonathan Trumbull Professor of American History and Government at Harvard University
| style="text-align:center;"|
|- 
|
| style="text-align:center;"| 
| MA
| Sex and gender historian
| style="text-align:center;"|
|- 
|
| style="text-align:center;"|1974
| BS
|Professor of mechanical and aerospace Engineering at the University of Alabama in Huntsville
| style="text-align:center;"|
|-
| 
| style="text-align:center;"| 
| BA
| Musicologist and folklorist; son of John Avery Lomax
| style="text-align:center;"|
|-
| 
| style="text-align:center;"| 1908
| BA
| Pioneering musicologist and folklorist
| style="text-align:center;"|
|-
| 
| style="text-align:center;"|
| MSc
| Computer scientist, founded Deja News
| style="text-align:center;"|
|-
| 
| style="text-align:center;"| 1966
| PhD
| Pioneering piezoelectric materials researcher for underwater sound transducers
| style="text-align:center;"|
|-
| 
| style="text-align:center;"| 1924; 1925
| BA, MA
| Professor of political science and pioneer of academic discipline of public administration
| style="text-align:center;"| 
|-
| 
| style="text-align:center;"| 19491955
| BAMAPhD
| Historian, 1987 Jefferson Lecturer
| style="text-align:center;"| 
|-
| 
| style="text-align:center;"|
| PhD
| Historian, Louisiana Redeemed: The Overthrow of Carpetbag Rule, 1876–1880, college president
| style="text-align:center;"|
|-
| 
| style="text-align:center;"| 1977
| PhD
| Stiles Professor in American Studies Emeritus at the University of Texas at Austin
| style="text-align:center;"|
|-
| 
| style="text-align:center;"| 1985
| PhD
| Joseph Zichis Chair and professor at Michigan State University; editor-in-chief of American Chemical Society's Journal of Chemical Information and Modeling.
| style="text-align:center;"|
|-
| 
| style="text-align:center;"| 1952, 1954
| | BAMA
| Historian of mathematics; first curator of mathematical instruments at the Smithsonian Institution
| style="text-align:center;"|
|-
| 
| style="text-align:center;"| 1999
| BScPhD
| Astronomer, research scientist at McDonald Observatory
| style="text-align:center;"|
|-
| 
| style="text-align:center;"| 1901
| BSc
| Mathematician
| style="text-align:center;"|
|-
| 
| style="text-align:center;"| 1976
| BA
| Evolutionary Biologist and Entomologist, University of Texas Leslie Surginer Endowed Professor, and co-founder of the Yale Microbial Diversity Institute
| style="text-align:center;"|
|-
| 
| style="text-align:center;"| 2004
| Post-doc
| Neuroscientist at Indian Institute of Science; author; Shanti Swarup Bhatnagar laureate
| style="text-align:center;"|
|-
| 
| style="text-align:center;"| 1980
| PhD
| Chemistry professor; Nelson Diversity Surveys author; scientific workforce scholar
| style="text-align:center;"|
|-
|Lisa Piccirillo
| style="text-align:center;"|2019
|PhD
|Mathematician; solved the Conway Knot Problem
| style="text-align:center;"|
|-
| 
| style="text-align:center;"|1940s
| BAMA
| Historian at Texas Christian University 1957–2000
| style=text-align:center;"|
|-
| 
| style="text-align:center;"| 1962, 1965, 1966 
| BScMScPhD
| Mathematician, inventor of Data Vortex 
| style="text-align:center;"|
|-
| 
| style="text-align:center;"|2015
| BSc
| Social scientist, author of The End of Animal Farming| style="text-align:center;"|
|-
| 
| style="text-align:center;"| 1944, 1949
| BA PhD
| Mathematician
| style="text-align:center;"|
|-
| 
| style="text-align:center;"| 1943
| BSME  PhD
| Professor of Mechanical Engineering; Director of Center for Electromechanics
| style="text-align:center;"|
|-
|Christine E. Schmidt
|1988
|BS
|American biomedical engineer, nerve graft inventor, and professor at University of Florida
|
|- 
| 
| style="text-align:center;"| 1944
| BSc
| Trauma surgeon
| style="text-align:center;"|
|-
|Robert Slocum
|style="text-align:center;"|1981
|PhD
|Professor of botany and biology at Goucher College
|style="text-align:center;"|
|-
|Bette Talvacchia
|style="text-align:center;"|1975
|MA
|Board of Trustees Distinguished Professor of Art History Emeritus at the University of Connecticut
|style="text-align:center;"|
|-
| 
| style="text-align:center;"| 1941  1943
| BAMA
| Nobel Prize in physiology or medicine
| style="text-align:center;"| 
|-
| 
| style="text-align:center;"| 1964
| PhD
| Astronomer
| style="text-align:center;"|
|-
| 
| style="text-align:center;"| 1983
| MA
| Astrophysicist
| style="text-align:center;"|
|-
| 
|style="text-align:center;"|
| BA
| Plastic surgeon, researcher, and co-author of Aesthetic Plastic Surgery Textbook| style="text-align:center;"|
|- 
| 
| style="text-align:center;"| 1915
| BA
| Historian and author of the Handbook of Texas| style="text-align:center;"|
|-
| 
| style="text-align:center;"| 1995
| BSc BA
| Mechanical engineer and public speaker on energy policy
| style="text-align:center;"|

|- 
| 
| style="text-align:center;"| 1988
| BSc
| Geneticist and anthropologist
| style="text-align:center;"|
|-
| 
| style="text-align:center;"| 1901
| BA, 
| Librarian; first woman to head the Texas State Library; first librarian of Texas Tech University; co-founder and first president of the Southwestern Library Association
| style="text-align:center;"|
|-
| 
| style="text-align:center;"| 1992
| MSc
| Astronaut, mission specialist on Space Shuttle mission STS-121
| style="text-align:center;"|
|}

 NASA 

Business and finance

 Entertainment 
Film and stage
Actors

Directors, producers, and writers

Music

Comics and cartooning

 Government, law, and public policy 
 U.S. presidential family members 

 Justices of the Supreme Court of the United States 

 Justices of state supreme courts 

 Federal judges 

 Members of the United States Congress Note: "D" indicates a Democrat while "R" indicates a Republican.''

Senators

Representatives

United States governors

Politicians and diplomats outside the U.S.

Members of the United States Cabinet

Armed forces

Other U.S. political and legal figures

Journalism and media

Literature, writing, and translation

Social reformers

Sports

Baseball

Softball

Basketball

Football

Golf

Swimming

Track and field

Other sports 

 Eileen Tell (born 1966), tennis player

Miscellaneous

See also 
 List of University of Texas at Austin faculty
 University of Texas at Austin

Notes 
 Blank cells indicate missing information; em-dashes (—) indicate that the alumnus attended but never graduated from UT Austin.

References

External links 
 UT Austin Alumni Association "Texas Exes"

University of Texas at Austin alumni
University of Texas at Austin alumni